Irina Ivanovna Pervuschina (born 1 April 1942) is a retired Russian artistic gymnast. She won four medals at the 1962 World Championships, including two gold medals, and attended the 1960 Summer Olympics as a substitute.

References

1942 births
Living people
World champion gymnasts
Medalists at the World Artistic Gymnastics Championships
Soviet female artistic gymnasts
Universiade medalists in gymnastics
Universiade gold medalists for the Soviet Union
Medalists at the 1961 Summer Universiade